Bantu Dandala (born 12 September 1994) is a South African cricketer. He made his List A debut for North West in the 2016–17 CSA Provincial One-Day Challenge on 12 February 2017.

References

External links
 

1994 births
Living people
South African cricketers
North West cricketers
Place of birth missing (living people)